George D. Chamberlain High School is a public high school in Tampa, Florida, United States. It was opened in 1956 on North Boulevard (on the corner of Busch Boulevard). The school is named in honor of George D. Chamberlain, who served for several years as a trustee for the Hillsborough County School System. 

In 2002, the school started a culinary operations academy program supported by Outback Steakhouse. No other school in Hillsborough County offers this program. Chamberlain is also the only school in the Hillsborough County Public School District to offer Marine Corps JROTC, with 100 plus cadets enrolled. Chamberlain boasts nationally award winning Junior Achievement 3DE Academic program as well as the Cambridge AICE program which allows students to earn an international diploma by taking advanced academic courses and passing exams administered by the University of Cambridge in England.

In the 2022-2023 academic year, students are enrolled in the following academic programs:

 102 JROTC Students
 157 Culinary Students
 392 Junior Achievement 3DE Academic Students
 546 Cambridge AICE Academic Students
 220 Cosmetology/Barbering Students
 136 Veterinary Assistant Students

In 2021, Chamberlain's 3DE students won the National Championship in the Case Competition for client Arby's in the first semester of the school's 3DE program.

Demographics
In the 2022–2023 academic year, the student population numbered 1,243. The ethnic makeup was as follows:
50.93% Hispanic
30.01% Black
12.15% White
4.67% Multi-racial
2.25% Asian

Athletics
Chamberlain is a member of the Florida High School Athletic Association and competes as the Storm in these sports:

 Boys: baseball, basketball, cross country, football, golf, soccer, swimming, wrestling
 Girls: basketball, cheerleading, cross country, flag football, golf, soccer, softball, swimming, volleyball, wrestling

Florida state championships

 Golf (Boys): 1959
 Golf (Girls): 1999 Spring, 1999 Fall, 2000
 Softball: 2003, 2012

Notable alumni

Dennis Aust, MLB pitcher.
Forrest Blue, NFL offensive lineman.
Brodrick Bunkley, NFL nose tackle.
Bob Burns, NFL running back.
Jane Castor, Mayor of Tampa
Kathy Castor, U.S. Representative, Florida - District 14.
Brian Clark, NFL wide receiver.
Joe Clermond, NFL defensive end.
Elijah Dukes, MLB outfielder.
Robert Gant, actor and producer.
Steve Garvey, MLB first baseman.
Chip Glass, NFL tight end.
Jay Gruden, Head coach, Washington Redskins.
Bob Hall (Class of 1960), Republican member of the Texas State Senate 
James Harrell, NFL linebacker.
Kevin House, Jr., NFL cornerback.
Oliver Hoyte, NFL linebacker/fullback.
Lauren Hutton (known then as Mary Hall), model-actress.
Jimmy Jordan, NFL running back.
Greg Lee, NFL wide receiver.
Dentarius Locke, American Track and field sprinter.
Dennis Lundy, NFL running back.
Bobby Sprowl, MLB pitcher for Boston Red Sox and Houston Astros
Aasif Mandvi, actor
Lynn Matthews, college football player and newspaper publisher.
Dean May, NFL quarterback.
Eugene McCaslin, NFL linebacker.
Mike Mekelburg, professional soccer midfielder.
Dave Miley, MLB manager for the Cincinnati Reds.
Ron Selesky, NFL player/Arena Football League coach.
Shock G, rapper.
Liz Vassey, actress.
Tom Walker, MLB pitcher.

Footnotes

References

External links

 
 Chamberlain High School Legacy Alliance Alumni
  The Chieftain school newspaper

High schools in Tampa, Florida
Public high schools in Florida
1956 establishments in Florida
Educational institutions established in 1956
Historically segregated African-American schools in Florida